Dependent ML is an experimental functional programming language proposed by Hongwei Xi  and Frank Pfenning. Dependent ML extends ML by a restricted notion of dependent types: types may be dependent on static indices of type Nat (natural numbers). Dependent ML employs a constraint theorem prover to decide a strong equational theory over the index expressions.

DML's types are not dependent on runtime values - there is still a phase distinction between compilation and execution of the program. By restricting the generality of full dependent types type checking remains decidable, but type inference becomes undecidable.

Dependent ML has been superseded by ATS and is no longer under active development.

References

Further reading 
 
 David Aspinall and Martin Hofmann (2005). "Dependent Types". In Pierce, Benjamin C. (ed.) Advanced Topics in Types and Programming Languages. MIT Press.

External links 
The home page of DML

ML programming language family
Declarative programming languages
Functional languages
Dependently typed languages
Programming languages created in the 1990s
Discontinued programming languages